In video games and other games, the passage of time must be handled in a way that players find fair and easy to understand. This is usually done in one of the two ways: real-time and turn-based.

Real-time

Real-time games have game time progress continuously according to the game clock. One example of such a game is the sandbox game Terraria, where one day-night cycle of 24 hours is equal to 24 minutes in real time. Players perform actions simultaneously as opposed to in sequential units or turns. Players must perform actions with the consideration that their opponents are actively working against them in real time, and may act at any moment. This introduces time management considerations and additional challenges (such as physical coordination in the case of video games).

Real-time gameplay is the dominant form of time-keeping found in simulation video games, and has to a large degree supplanted turn-based systems in other video game genres as well (for instance real-time strategy). Time is an important factor in most sports; and many, such as soccer or basketball, are almost entirely simultaneous in nature, retaining only a very limited notion of turns in specific instances, such as the free kick in soccer and the free throw and shot clock in basketball. In the card games Nertz and Ligretto, players must compete to discard their cards as quickly as possible and do not take turns.

While game time in video games is in fact subdivided into discrete units due to the sequential nature of computing, these intervals or units are typically so small as to be imperceptible.

Turn-based

Turn-based games have game flow that is partitioned into defined parts, called turns, moves, or plays. A player of a turn-based game is allowed a period of analysis (sometimes bounded, sometimes unbounded) before committing to a game action, ensuring a separation between the game flow and the thinking process, which in turn presumably leads to better choices. Once every player has taken their turn, that round of play is over, and any special shared processing is done. This is followed by the next round of play. In games where the game flow unit is time, turns may represent periods such as years, months, weeks or days.

Turn-based games come in two main forms depending on whether, play is simultaneous or sequential. The former games fall under the category of simultaneously executed games (also called phase-based or "We-Go"), with Diplomacy being a notable example. The latter games fall into player-alternated games (also called "I-Go-You-Go", or "IGOUGO" for short), and are further subdivided into (A) ranked, (B) round-robin start and (C) random—the difference being the order under which players start within a turn: (A) the first player being the same every time, (B) the first player selection policy is round-robin, and (C) the first player is randomly selected. Some games also base the order of play on an "initiative" score that may in part be based on players' attributes or positions within the game or other, outside factors as well as dice rolls. Wizard101 is an example of this style.

The term turn-based gaming is also used in play-by-mail games and use browser-based gaming sites that allow for gameplay to extend beyond a single session, over long periods of time, often requiring months to complete games such as Go, chess, and infinite chess.

Sub-types
Various adaptations of the real-time and turn-based systems have been implemented to address common or perceived shortcomings of these systems (though they often introduce new issues that did not exist before). These include:

Timed turns and time compression
Timed turns are designed to resolve issues of fairness where one player uses a greater amount of time to complete their turn than another player. In chess, for instance, a pair of stop clocks may be used in order to place an upper limit on game length.

In exchange chess, four players on two teams play on two boards with each team taking one white and one black side. Any taken piece is given to a teammate, and can be placed on their board as a standard move (in any position that does not put their opponent in check). A common strategy is to gain a temporary material advantage, pass it on to a teammate, and then stop playing on one's own board—thereby allowing the teammate to use the advantage for many future moves on their board. To avoid this, players are often limited to ten seconds per move—with their opponent being allowed to remove one of the player's pawns from the board for each additional ten seconds consumed.

The turn-based strategy game Utopia (1982) featured an early example of timed turns. The early Ultima role-playing video games were strictly turn-based, but starting with Ultima III: Exodus (1983), if the player waited too long to issue a command, the game would issue a "pass" command automatically, thereby allowing enemies to take their turns while the player character did nothing. Further, many browser-based games allocate a number of turns that can be played within a certain period of time, called a tick (see next section).

Time compression is a feature commonly found in real-time games such as flight simulators. It allows the player to speed up the game time by some (usually adjustable) factor. This permits the player to shorten the subjective duration of long and relatively uneventful periods of gameplay.

Ticks and rounds
A tick-based game is a game that is played using ticks, or units of time. Not to be confused with a game round, a tick can be any measurement of real time, from seconds to days or even months, and is the basic unit upon which all important game actions take place. Players in tick-based games are allocated a certain number of turns per tick, which are subsequently refreshed at the beginning of each new tick. Predominantly found in browser-based MMORPGs, tick-based games differ from other turn-based games in that ticks always occur after the same amount of time has expired. Conversely, in a typical turn-based game, a turn would end only once every player has made all of their moves. In real-time games players are not limited, time-wise, in the number of actions they can take.

In some real-time games, a notion of rounds exists, whereby game actions are timed according to a common interval that is longer than 'real time'. For instance, units might only begin or cease to act at the beginning or end of a round. In video games such as the Baldur's Gate (1998–2001) and Neverwinter Nights (2002–2008) series, the notion of rounds is carried over in part from the pen-and-paper rule systems they are based upon; and a similar (but unrelated) example is when a game unit's ability to act is limited by the length of its combat animation, in which case the unit may become unresponsive until the animation has completed.

Online turn-based gaming uses the term rounds differently: in these games a round refers to when a new game begins following the completion of a previous one (i.e. after someone or some group of people has "won").

Active Time Battle
The "Active Time Battle" (ATB) system was introduced by Hiroyuki Ito in Final Fantasy IV (1991). The system discarded the discrete turn-based battles of the first three entries in favour of a continuous flow of actions and variable wait times. The fact that enemies can attack or be attacked at any time is credited with injecting urgency and excitement into the combat system. The ATB system was fully developed in Final Fantasy V (1992), which improved it by introducing a time gauge to indicate to the player which character's turn is next. The ATB system has since been used in Final Fantasy VI (1994), Final Fantasy VII (1997), Final Fantasy VIII (1999), Final Fantasy IX (2000), and Final Fantasy X-2 (2003). Both Final Fantasy XII (2006) and Final Fantasy XIII (2009) used heavily modified versions of the system. The ATB system was also used in Chrono Trigger (1995).

Simultaneously executed and clock-based turns
In simultaneously executed games (also called "phase-based", "We-Go" or "Turn-based WeGo"), turns are separated into two distinct phases: decision and execution. During the decision phase each player plans and determines their units' actions. The decision phase occurs at the same time for everyone, so there is little wait for anyone to finish. In the execution phase, all players' decisions are put into action, and these actions are performed more or less automatically and at the same time. The execution phase is non-interactive, and there is no waiting for other players to complete their turns. One early example is the 1959 board game Diplomacy. Video game examples include Laser Squad Nemesis (2003), the Combat Mission series (2000–), Master of Orion (1993–2003) series, Star Hammer: The Vanguard Prophecy (2015) and Battlestar Galactica Deadlock (2017).

Clock-based games tie all unit actions directly to the game clock. Turns begin and end depending on the duration specified for each action, resulting in a sequence of turns that is highly variable and has no set order. This system is frequently cited for its realism when compared to other turn-based systems. It is also possible in this system for different players' actions to occur at the same time with respect to the game clock, as in real-time or simultaneously executed games. Examples of video games that use this type of system include Typhoon of Steel (1988) and MechForce (1991), both originally for the Amiga.

Unit initiative and acting outside one's turn
In some games the sequence of turns depends on the initiative statistic of each unit no matter which side the unit belongs to. Games of this type are still technically sequential (e.g. "I-Go-You-Go"), as only one unit can perform an action at a time, and the duration of actions is not tied to the game clock. Examples include the video games The Temple of Elemental Evil (2003) and Final Fantasy Tactics (1997).

Some games—notably, the X-COM series (1993–1998) of video games and the board wargame, Advanced Squad Leader (1985)—allow players to act outside of their normal turn by providing a means of interrupting an opponent's turn and executing additional actions. Typically, the number and type of actions a player may take during an interrupt sequence is limited by the number of points remaining in the player's action point pool (or something similar) carried over from the previous turn. A mild version of this is the ability to perform attacks of opportunity in systems based on Dungeons & Dragons (DnD). Newer editions of DnD also allow a Ready-action to prepare an action to be executed during the enemy's turn – this is also implemented in some video games like Solasta: Crown of the Magister (2020).

The Silent Storm (2003–2004) video game series includes an "Interrupt" statistic for each character to determine the likelihood of out-of-turn action. In the video game M.A.X. (1996), defensive units may be set to fire out of turn at the expense of being able to fire in their own turn. In the board game Tide of Iron, the player  may play a card that allows him to interrupt an opponent's turn and perform an action. In the Mario & Luigi series, the player often has the opportunity to "counterattack" on the enemy's turn, causing damage and often halting the attack.

Special turns and phases
In some turn-based games, not all turns are alike. The board game Imperium Romanum II (1985), for instance, features a "Taxation and Mobilization" phase in every third turn (month), which does not occur in the other turns. The videogame King Arthur: The Role-Playing Wargame (2009) features something similar, where every fourth turn, the season turns to winter, which is the only time when buildings can be constructed and taxes are collected, while it's not possible to move units. In the board game Napoleon (1974), every third player turn is "night turn" where combat is not allowed.

Other turn-based games feature several phases dedicated to different types of activities within each turn. In the Battle Isle (1991–2001) series of video games players issue movement orders for all units in one phase, and attack orders in a later phase. In the board game Agricola (2007) turns are divided into three phases: "Upkeep", "Replenishing" and "Work". A fourth phase, "Harvest", occurs every few turns.

Partially or optionally turn-based and real-time
Many other games that are not generally turn-based retain the notion of turn-based play during specific sequences. For example, the role-playing video games Fallout (1997), Silent Storm (2003) and Baldur's Gate 3 are turn-based during the combat phase, and real-time throughout the remainder of the game. This speeds up portions of the game (such as exploration) where the careful timing of actions is not crucial to player success. Some turn-based games have been criticized for omitting this feature.

Other video games, such as the Total War series (2000–2011), X-COM (1993) and Jagged Alliance 2 (1999), combine a turn-based strategic layer with real-time tactical combat or vice versa.

Lastly, the video games X-COM: Apocalypse (1997), Fallout Tactics (2001) and Arcanum: Of Steamworks and Magick Obscura (2001) offered players the option to play in either turn-based or real-time mode via a configuration setting. The latter also offered a "fast turn-based" mode, though all three of the game's modes were criticized for being poorly balanced and oversimplified. Newer games that offer a choice between turn-based and (pausable) real-time include Pillars of Eternity II: Deadfire (2018), Pathfinder: Kingmaker (2018, added later per patch) and Pathfinder: Wrath of the Righteous (2021).

Pausable real-time
In real-time games with an active pause system (also called "pausable real-time" or "real-time with pause"), players are able to pause the game and issue orders such that once a game is un-paused, orders are automatically put into effect. This type of system can offer additional tactical options, and can resolve issues that arise in other real-time games where orders must be given to multiple units at the same time (normally an impossibility in real-time games). It can also help players who desire extra time for analysis before issuing actions.

There are several variations of pausable real-time combat. Among mouse-driven party-based computer role-playing games, the pausable real-time system was popularized by the Baldur's Gate series (1998–2001), though the same mechanic was also present in earlier role-playing games such as in Knights of Xentar (1991), Darklands (1992), Tales of Phantasia (1995), and as well in the real-time strategy games Total Annihilation (1997) and Homeworld (1999). In Baldur's Gate, players also have the option to allow the artificial intelligence to take control during combat, though they can press the spacebar at any time to regain control of their characters. Further, in Baldur's Gate, players are able to configure the game to automatically pause when certain conditions are met, such as at the end of a round or upon the death of a non-player character. A variation of active pause, called "Smart Pause Mode" or SPM, is an advertised feature of Apeiron's Brigade E5: New Jagged Union (2006) and 7.62: High Calibre (2007).

Among strategy video games, it is used exclusively in the slow-paced grand strategy games developed by Paradox Interactive, and was the originally intended mode of the Civilization series (1991-) before the developers decided to switch to turn-based. Among construction and management simulations, it has been present in the SimCity series since SimCity (1989), as well as the Transport Tycoon and RollerCoaster Tycoon series.

In the single-character console RPGs, Parasite Eve (1998) and Vagrant Story (2000), the player can pause the game to take aim with a weapon. In Vagrant Story's case, this allows players to target specific body parts while the game is paused—a similar mechanic was later used in the real-time role-playing game Last Rebellion (2010). Jagged Alliance 2 (1999)) and Fallout (1997) allow players to target individual body parts during turn-based combat, the latter led to the creation of the V.A.T.S system in the real-time RPG Fallout 3, where you could pause the game to target individual body parts. Final Fantasy XII (2006) expanded on active pause combat with its "gambits" system, which allows players to collect and apply preferences to the artificial intelligence routines of partner characters, who will then perform certain actions in response to certain conditions. A similar "tactics" system later appeared in Dragon Age: Origins (2009) and Dragon Age II (2011). Knights of Xentar (1991) and Secret of Mana (1993) also allow an adjustable artificial intelligence to take control during combat.

Real-time vs. turn-based gameplay
A debate has emerged between fans of real-time and turn-based video games (usually some type of strategy or role-playing game) based on the merits of each system.

Various arguments are made by proponents. Arguments made in favor of turn-based systems include:
 The extra time available to players in turn-based systems allow them to plan their moves to a greater degree, and permit game designers to offer additional tactical and gameplay options. The same options when used in combination with the time-pressures of real-time games, on the other hand, can cause new players to feel overwhelmed.
 Games are fairer due to a lack of reliance upon player reflexes. A player with slower reflexes is not at a disadvantage compared to faster players; rather, only the ability to think through and solve the current problem is important.
 Games can in theory have better artificial intelligence due to the greater amount of computer processing power available to them.
 It is more realistic to control multiple units intelligently using this system, as players do not have to divide their attention among multiple independent units all moving simultaneously. Likewise, it is easier to keep track of what the enemy is doing at all times since the player is typically informed of every move in advance (not taking into account fog of war).

Arguments made in favor of real-time systems include:
 Armies pausing mid-combat to take turns and act in a sequential manner is unrealistic. Real-life combat occurs simultaneously with no side pausing to let the other side move; (However, this only pertains to sequential turn-based systems, not "we-go" systems.)
 Thinking (and acting) quickly is part of the strategy and constitutes an additional element of challenge.
 Real-time systems are viscerally exciting and add to players' sense of immersion. In essence, players feel more like they are really "there" and experiencing game events first-hand.
 Turn-based games have too many rules and are difficult to master.
 Real-time games are more multiplayer-friendly; sitting around and waiting while other players take their turns can become tiresome.
 The added element of a shared clock ensures that each situation cannot be reduced to an easily repeatable sequential series of steps. Rather, the reliance upon player timing ensures that outcomes are highly variable.

See also
 List of play-by-mail games
 Play-by-mail game
 Sequential game
 Simultaneous game

References

External links
 Time Systems - RogueBasin - Discusses several different types of timing systems used in roguelikes.
 12 ways to improve turn-based RPG combat systems - Editorial discussing how to design turn-based combat systems.
 Taking Turns (Or Yes, It IS Your Job to Make Me Have Fun) - Editorial at Gamasutra.
 Turn Based Strategy Makes Me Care - Editorial at Gamasutra.
 Turn-Based VS Real-Time at Gamasutra

Timekeeping
Video game culture
Video game gameplay